Tõnu Lehtsaar (born 2 May 1960, Tartu) is an Estonian psychologist.

In 1983, he graduated from Tartu State University in psychology.

From 2000 until 2016, he was a professor of psychology of religion at the University of Tartu. From 2006 to 2007 and again from 2017 to 2018, he was the acting rector of the University of Tartu.

Awards
 1997: Order of the White Star, IV class.

References

1960 births
Living people
Estonian psychologists
Academic staff of the University of Tartu
Recipients of the Order of the White Star, 4th Class
University of Tartu alumni
Rectors of the University of Tartu